Dams: The Lethal Water Bombs is a short documentary film about the Mullaperiyar Dam, and the possible natural disaster inherent in the structure. This 21-minute documentary was produced by Aries Telecasting Private Ltd., and directed by Sohan Roy.

Plot
The Banqiao Dam in China, with its 492 million cubic meters of water, has a similar capacity to the Mullaperiyar Dam, with 443 million cubic meters.  When it was destroyed by torrential rains in 1975, it claimed the lives of 250,000 people. This documentary is based on the possibility of a similar disaster happening to the Mullaperiyar Dam in India.

Awards won
Best Editing — Los Angeles Movie Awards 2011 
Best Visual Effects — Los Angeles Movie Awards 2011 
Best Documentary Short — Los Angeles Cinema Festival of Hollywood 2011

See also
 Dam999

References

External links
 
 

2011 films
2011 short documentary films
Indian short documentary films

Documentary films about disasters
Documentary films about hydroelectricity
Documentary films about water and the environment
2010s English-language films